The 1995 Atlantic 10 men's basketball tournament was played March 4–6 and 9, 1995. The first three rounds were played at the Palestra in Philadelphia, Pennsylvania, while the final was played at the Mullins Center in Amherst, Massachusetts.  The winner was named champion of the Atlantic 10 Conference and received an automatic bid to the 1995 NCAA Men's Division I Basketball Tournament. The University of Massachusetts won the tournament for the fourth year in a row. Temple also received a bid to the NCAA Tournament. Lou Roe of Massachusetts was named the tournament's Most Outstanding Player, making the All-Championship Team for the fourth consecutive year. Future NBA players Rick Brunson (Temple) and Marcus Camby (Massachusetts) were among those also named to the All-Championship Team.

Bracket

* - Overtime# - 2OT

Atlantic 10 men's basketball tournament
Tournament
Atlantic 10 men's basketball tournament
Atlantic 10 men's basketball tournament
Atlantic 10 men's basketball tournament